Law enforcement in San Marino is the responsibility of the centralized Civil Police, together with the Corps of Gendarmerie of San Marino (militarized police), and the Fortress Guard (border patrol with military status), have been providing law enforcement in San Marino since a statute in 1987, which redefined their roles, further supported by revised regulations for both the Gendarmerie and the Fortress Guard, which was approved by the Government of San Marino in 2008. Under the 2008 regulations the Gendarmerie and the Fortress Guards are responsible for policing, criminal investigation, national penitentiary, changing the guard, border patrol, customs control, personal protection, and national security, while the Civil Police are tasked with tax collection, domestic security, traffic control, and civil defence. All three agencies are subordinate to the Secretary of State of Home Affairs. San Marino is also part of the international policing organization Interpol, and as such there is an Interpol office in San Marino City.

At the end of 2012, there were 160 police officers serving in San Marino; this includes: 70 Gendarmerie, 50 Civil Police, and 40 Fortress Guard. While total law enforcement expenditures amounted to $13.3 million.

See also
Military of San Marino

Notes